
Gmina Wodzierady is a rural gmina (administrative district) in Łask County, Łódź Voivodeship, in central Poland.

Villages
Gmina Wodzierady contains the villages and settlements of Alfonsów, Chorzeszów, Czarnysz, Dobków, Dobruchów, Hipolitów, Jesionna, Józefów, Kiki, Kwiatkowice, Kwiatkowice-Kolonia, Leśnica, Ludowinka, Magdalenów, Magnusy, Mauryców, Pelagia, Piorunów, Piorunówek, Przyrownica, Stanisławów, Teodorów, Wandzin, Włodzimierz, Wodzierady, Wola Czarnyska, Wrząsawa and Zalesie.

Neighbouring gminas
Gmina Wodzierady is bordered by the gminas of Dobroń, Łask, Lutomiersk, Pabianice, Szadek and Zadzim.

References
Polish official population figures 2006

Wodzierady
Łask County